Katrivier Dam is a multi-arch type dam located on the Kat River, near Seymour, Eastern Cape, South Africa. It was established in 1969. The primary purpose of the dam is to serve for irrigation and domestic use. The hazard potential of the dam has been ranked high (3).

See also
List of reservoirs and dams in South Africa
List of rivers of South Africa

References 

 List of South African Dams from the South African Department of Water Affairs

Dams in South Africa
Dams completed in 1969